C2x is an informal name for the next (after C17) major C language standard revision.  It is expected to be voted on in 2023 and would therefore become C23.  The most recent publicly available draft of C23 was released on January 24, 2023.

The first WG14 meeting for the C2x draft was held in October 2019, then virtual remote meetings were held due to COVID-19 pandemic in March/April 2020, October/November 2020, March/April 2021, August/September 2021, November/December 2021, January/February 2022, May 2022, July 2022, January 2023.

Features
Changes integrated into the latest C23 draft are:

Standard Library (new functions)
 add memset_explicit() function in <string.h> to erase sensitive data, where memory store must always be performed regardless of optimizations.
 add memccpy() function in <string.h> to efficiently concatenate strings - similar to POSIX and SVID C extensions.
 add strdup() and strndup() functions in <string.h> to allocate a copy of a string – similar to POSIX and SVID C extensions.
 add memalignment() function in <stdlib.h> to determine the byte alignment of a pointer.
 add bit utility functions / macros / types in new header <stdbit.h> to examine many integer types.  All start with stdc_ to minimize conflict with legacy code and 3rd party libraries.
 In the following, replace * with uc, us, ui, ul, ull for five function names, or blank for a type-generic macro.
 add stdc_count_ones*() and stdc_count_zeros*() to count number of 1 or 0 bits in value.
 add stdc_leading_ones*() and stdc_leading_zeros*() to count leading 1 or 0 bits in value.
 add stdc_trailing_ones*() and stdc_trailing_zeros*() to count trailing 1 or 0 bits in value.
 add stdc_first_leading_one*() and stdc_first_leading_zero*() to find first leading bit with 1 or 0 in value.
 add stdc_first_trailing_one*() and stdc_first_trailing_zero*() to find first trailing bit with 1 or 0 in value.
 add stdc_has_single_bit*() to determine if value an exact power of 2 (return true if and only if there is a single 1 bit).
 add stdc_bit_floor*() to determine the largest integral power of 2 that is not greater than value.
 add stdc_bit_ceil*() to determine the smallest integral power of 2 that is not less than value.
 add stdc_bit_width*() to determine number of bits to represent a value.

Standard Library (existing functions)
 add %b binary conversion specifier to printf() function family, prepending non-zero values with 0b, similar to how %x works.  Implementations that previously didn't use %B as their own extension are encouraged to implement and prepend non-zero values with 0B, similar to how %X works.
 add %b binary conversion specifier to scanf() function family.
 add 0b and 0B binary conversion support to strtol() and wcstol() function families.
 make the functions bsearch(), bsearch_s(), memchr(), strchr(), strpbrk(), strrchr(), strstr(), and their wide counterparts wmemchr(), wcschr(), wcspbrk(), wcsrchr(), wcsstr() return a const qualified object if one was passed to them.

Preprocessor
Both directives were added to C++23 and GCC 12 too.
 add  directive for binary resource inclusion.
 add  directive for diagnostics.
 add  allowing the availability of a header to be checked by preprocessor directives.
 add  allowing the availability of an attribute to be checked by preprocessor directives.  (see C++ compatibility group below for new attribute feature)
 add  functional macro for variadic macros which expands to its argument only if a variadic argument has been passed to the containing macro.

Types
 add  type.
 add  and  types for bit-precise integers. Add  macro for maximum bit width.  Add ckd_add(), ckd_sub(), ckd_mul() macros for checked integer operations.
 Variably-modified types (but not VLAs which are automatic variables allocated on the stack) become a mandatory feature.
 Standardization of the typeof(...) operator.
 the meaning of the  keyword was changed to cause type inference while also retaining its old meaning of a storage class specifier if used alongside a type.

Constants
 add  constant for nullptr_t type.
 add the ability to specify the underlying type of an enum.

C++ compatibility
 add C++11 style attribute syntax using double square brackets . Duplicate attributes are allowed for compatibility with C++23.
 add u8 prefix for character literals to represent UTF-8 encoding for compatibility with C++17.
 add  and  preprocessing directives for compatibility with C++23. (see preprocessor group above)

Other
 Support for the ISO/IEC 60559:2020, the current version of the IEEE 754 standard for floating-point arithmetic, with extended binary floating-point arithmetic and (optional) decimal floating-point arithmetic.
 Single-argument _Static_assert.
 Labels can appear before declarations and at the end of compound statements.
 Unnamed parameters in function definitions.
 Better support for using const with arrays.
 Zero initialization with {} (including initialization of VLAs).
 The constexpr specifier for objects but not functions, unlike C++'s equivalent.
 variadic functions no longer need a named argument before the ellipsis and the  macro no longer needs a second argument nor does it evaluate any argument after the first one if present.
Also, the functions mbrtoc8() and c8rtomb() to convert a narrow multibyte character to UTF-8 encoding and a single code point from UTF-8 to a narrow multibyte character representation respectively.
 allow storage class specifiers to appear in compound literal definition.

Obsolete features
Some old obsolete features are either removed or deprecated:
 Remove Trigraphs.
 Remove K&R function definitions/declarations.
 Remove representations for signed integers other than two's complement. Two's complement signed integer representation will be required.
 The  macros in <float.h> are obsolescent features.

Compiler support
The GCC 9, Clang 9.0, and Pelles C 11.00 compilers implement an experimental compiler flag to support this standard.

See also 

 C++23, C++20, C++17, C++14, C++11, C++03, C++98, versions of the C++ programming language standard
 Compatibility of C and C++

References

External links
 C Working Group WG14 Documents
 N3088, draft of C23 standard (January 2023)

C (programming language)
Programming language standards